This is a list of the largest airlines in Oceania. It is ranked by number of transported passengers.

By passengers carried (millions)

Notes
 Based on Fiscal Year ending 30 Jun. Includes figures for QantasLink, Jetstar Airways, Jetconnect and Network Aviation.
 Based on Fiscal Year ending 30 Jun. Includes figures for Virgin Australia, Virgin Australia Regional Airlines and Virgin Samoa.
 Based on Fiscal Year ending 30 Jun. Includes figures for Air New Zealand Link (inc. Air Nelson, Eagle Airways and  Mount Cook Airline).
 Includes figures for Pacific Sun.
 Based on Fiscal Year ending 30 Jun. Includes figures for Regional Express Airlines, Airlink and Pel-Air.

See also
List of largest airlines in Africa
List of largest airlines in Asia
List of largest airlines in Europe
List of largest airlines in North America
List of largest airlines in South America

References

Oceania
Airlines of Oceania
 Largest